Mathilda Wilhelmina Rotkirch (28 July 1813 – 6 March 1842) was a Finnish painter. She is often referred to as the first female artist in Finland. She principally made portrait paintings.

Biography
Rotkirch was born in Borgå, Finland. She was the daughter of Baron Karl Fredrik Rotkirch and Augusta Fredrika Elisabeth Rotkirch née Aminoff.

In the spring of 1833, she made his first study trip to Stockholm where she studied with Johan Gustaf Sandberg and  Robert Wilhelm Ekman. She was a student at the Royal Swedish Academy of Arts between 1833 and 1838. 
She took a study trip in 1840–1841 along with artist  Sophie Aminoff (1808–1862) and her husband Carl Reuterskiöld, on a journey through Europe. They visited Lübeck, Hamburg, Kassel, Strasbourg, Bern, Geneva, Milan and Paris, where she studied with the Swedish painter and designer Per Wickenberg (1812–1846).

She died of a lung ailment in Turku during 1842 at the age of 28. She was buried in the family grave at Näsebacken next to Porvoo.

Rotkirch was represented in an exhibition in Finland in 1847. She is represented at both Ateneum and Cygnaeus Gallery.

References

Literature 

 Kuurne, Jouni: Mathilda Rotkirch: Taiteilija ja matkailija. 2002.
 
 Westermarck, Helena: Mathilda Rotkirch. Historiska och litteraturhistoriska studier 2, pp. 8–78. Svensk Litteratursällskap i Finland, Helsingfors 1926.
 Willner-Rönnholm, Margareta: Målarinnan Mathilda Rotkirch: En bortglömd pionjär? Finsk Tidskrift, 1/2003.

1813 births
1842 deaths
19th-century Finnish nobility
19th-century Finnish women artists
19th-century Finnish painters
Finnish women painters